New Religion is Primal Fear's seventh full-length album,  released on 21 September 2007.

Music videos were made for "Fighting the Darkness" and "Sign of Fear".

Track listing

Credits 
Primal Fear
 Ralf Scheepers – lead vocals
 Henny Wolter – guitars
 Stefan Leibing – guitars
 Mat Sinner – bass guitar, vocals
 Randy Black – drums

Guest/session musicians
 Simone Simons – female vocals on "Everytime It Rains"
 Magnus Karlsson – lead guitars on "Everytime It Rains"
 Tobias Lundgren – backing vocals
 Ronny Milianowicz – loops
 Matthias Ulmer – keyboards, orchestral arrangements

Crew 
 Mat Sinner – producer, engineering (additional)
 Charlie Bauerfeind – producer (additional), engineering
 Ralf Scheepers – engineering (additional)
 Achim "Akeem" Köhler – engineering (additional), mastering
 Ronald Prent – mixing
 Macela Zorro – mixing (additional)
 Katja Piolka – cover art, photography

2007 albums
Primal Fear (band) albums
Frontiers Records albums